The following is a list of major and secondary streets and roads in Vancouver, British Columbia, Canada. The city is organized on a modified east–west/north–south grid pattern (with some allowance for natural contours). Thoroughfares downtown and in a few other locations run in a northeast–southwest/northwest–southeast pattern.

Major Road Network
The following are arterial routes, as defined by TransLink.

Downtown
Georgia Street southeast to Main Street
Howe Street
Nelson Street northwest to Howe Street
Seymour Street
Smithe Street northwest to Howe Street

East–west
Hastings Street west to Burrard Street
McGill Street west to Nanaimo Street
Dundas Street east to Nanaimo Street
Powell Street west to Hawks Avenue
East 1st Avenue
Terminal Avenue
Broadway
West 10th Avenue east to Alma Street
Grandview Highway west to Nanaimo Street
41st Avenue
70th Avenue

North–south
Boundary Road north to Hastings Street
Clark Drive north to Powell Street
Knight Street
Main Street between Broadway and Georgia Street
Oak Street north to Broadway
Cambie Street
Granville Street

Other
Kingsway
Marine Drive

Other major thoroughfares

Downtown
Burrard Street
Cordova Street
Davie Street
Denman Street
Dunsmuir Street
Georgia Street
Pacific Boulevard
Robson Street
Thurlow Street

East–west (west of Ontario Street)
Ontario Street marks the boundary in most of Vancouver between thoroughfares designated "West" and those designated "East" (e.g. East 41st Avenue, West King Edward Avenue).

4th Avenue
12th Avenue
16th Avenue
King Edward Avenue
33rd Avenue
41st Avenue (part of Highway 99)
49th Avenue
57th Avenue
70th Avenue

North–south (west of Ontario Street)
Alma Street
Arbutus Street / West Boulevard
Macdonald Street

East–west (east of Ontario Street)
Prior Street / Venables Street
2nd Avenue / Great Northern Way / 6th Avenue
12th Avenue
16th Avenue
22nd Avenue west to Nanaimo Street
29th Avenue west to Nanaimo Street
33rd Avenue
King Edward Avenue
41st Avenue east to Kingsway
49th Avenue
54th Avenue east to Tyne Street
57th Avenue east to Argyle Drive

North–south (east of Ontario Street)
Dundas Street marks the boundary in most of Vancouver between thoroughfares designated "North" and those to the south (e.g. North Nanaimo Street, North Renfrew Street). Streets to the south are not prefixed as such. West of Lakewood Drive, the only street designated "North" is one block of Dunlevy Avenue, north of Railway Street.

Main Street
Fraser Street
Windsor Street
Commercial Drive / Victoria Drive
Nanaimo Street
Renfrew Street
Rupert Street / Kerr Street
Joyce Street

References

 
Vancouver
Roads
Roads in Vancouver